Powiat nowodworski may refer to either of two counties (powiats) in Poland:
Nowy Dwór Gdański County, in Pomeranian Voivodeship (north Poland)
Nowy Dwór County, Masovian Voivodeship, in Masovian Voivodeship (east-central Poland)